Tsing Long Highway is an expressway of Route 3 from North West Tsing Yi Interchange on Tsing Yi Island to Yuen Long, in Hong Kong. Ting Kau Bridge and Tai Lam Tunnel are part of the expressway. It connects with Cheung Tsing Highway and Lantau Link at its southern end, and San Tin Highway and Yuen Long Highway at its northern end. Its speed limit at parts south of Tai Lam Tunnel and Tai Lam Tunnel is 80 km/h and parts north of Tai Lam Tunnel is 100 km/h.

There are no intermediate exits on the southbound carriageway of Tsing Long Highway on the north of Tai Lam Tunnel, so this entire section is a toll road. Likewise there are no entrances on the northbound carriageway on this section.

Interchanges

See also
Other highways in Kowloon and New Territories:

 Tsing Kwai Highway - Route 3
 West Kowloon Corridor - Route 5
 West Kowloon Highway - Route 3
 Tsing Long Highway - Route 3
 Tate's Cairn Highway - Route 2
 Cheung Tsing Highway - Route 3

External links
 Highways in Kowloon
 Google Maps of Tsing Long Highway

Expressways in Hong Kong
Extra areas operated by NT taxis
Route 3 (Hong Kong)
Tsing Yi
Yuen Long
Infobox road instances in Hong Kong